Most Beloved Sister is a 1949 children's book by the Swedish author Astrid Lindgren. It was originally included in the collection Nils Karlsson-Pyssling: sagor, then re-released in 1973 with illustrations by Hans Arnold.

Plot
The story revolves around seven-year-old Barbro, who has a secret twin sister called Ylva-li, the only person in Barbro's life who likes her more than anything else, and who calls her Most Beloved Sister. Ylva-li is the queen of the golden hall which can be reached by crawling down a hole under the rose bush, Salikon. Barbro and Ylva-Li ride their horses and have adventures together. When Barbro has to return to her parents, Ylva-Li tells her that she will die when the roses on Salikon wither. Barbro refuses to believe her and returns to her parents, who pretend that they have missed her. The next day, the roses on the rose bush are all dead, and there is no longer a hole in the ground.

Overview 
Most Beloved Sister was first published in 1949 in the Swedish magazine Vi. It was illustrated by Eva Billow. In 1949 it was published in the fairy tale collection Nils Karlsson Pyssling. In 1950 Astrid Lindgren was awarded the Nils Holgersson Plaque for this book.

Film

A short-film, directed by Göran Carmback, based on the book, was made in 1988.

References 

Works by Astrid Lindgren
1949 children's books
Children's fiction books
Swedish children's literature
Novels about siblings
Twins in fiction